"Tonight's the Kind of Night" is a song by English folk band Noah and the Whale. The single served as the second single from the band's third studio album, Last Night on Earth. The single was released in the United Kingdom as a digital download on 15 May 2011. The backing of the chorus is heavily influenced by the intro chords of The Who's Baba O'Riley.  An instrumental version of the song was used as the introduction to the 2012 Summer Olympics opening and closing ceremonies.

Music video
The music video for the song appeared on their YouTube channel on 11 April 2011.

Track listing

Chart performance
"Tonight's the Kind of Night" debuted on the UK Singles Chart on 8 May 2011 at number 87, and rose to #74 a week later.

Charts

Credits and personnel
Lead vocals – Noah and the Whale
Producers – Charlie Fink, Jason Lader
Lyrics –  Charlie Fink
Label: Mercury Records

Release history

References

2011 singles
Mercury Records singles
Noah and the Whale songs
2011 songs